Geta is one of the woredas in the Southern Nations, Nationalities, and Peoples' Region of Ethiopia. Geta is one of the sub-groups of the Sebat Bet Gurage. Part of the Gurage Zone, the Geta woreda is bordered on the south by the Silt'e Zone, on the southwest by Endegagn, on the west by Enemorina Eaner, on the north by Cheha, and on the northeast by Gumer. Geta was separated from the Gumer woreda.

Demographics 
Based on the 2007 Census conducted by the CSA, this woreda has a total population of 69,455, of whom 33,020 are men and 36,435 women. The majority of the inhabitants were reported as Muslim, with 77.6% of the population reporting that belief, while 17.19% practiced Ethiopian Orthodox Christianity, and 4.26% were Protestants.

Notes 

Districts of the Southern Nations, Nationalities, and Peoples' Region